Songdo (alternatively from , "Pine City", or , "Pine Island(s)"), may refer to:

 Kaesong, North Korea
 Songdo Point, North Korea
 Songdo International Business District, a district in Incheon, South Korea
 Songdo Beach in Busan, South Korea